Frankie Billy Randall (September 25, 1961 – December 23, 2020) was an American professional boxer who competed from 1983 to 2005. He was a three-time light welterweight world champion, having held the WBA and WBC titles between 1994 and 1997. Randall is best known for being the first boxer to defeat Julio César Chávez, whose record at the time of their 1994 fight stood at 89 wins and a draw.

Professional career
Randall was born in Birmingham, Alabama, and grew up in Morristown, Tennessee. He turned pro in 1981 after a career as an amateur boxer. He won his pro debut in June of that year, but was inactive in 1982 and did not fight again until February 1983.

Randall fought and won 23 times between 1983 and June 1985, when he fought former and future champ Edwin Rosario and lost a unanimous decision over 10 rounds.

On July 4, 1986, Randall drew with Freddie Pendleton for the USBA regional lightweight title, then watched Pendleton get a title shot instead of him. In October 1987, Randall was knocked out by Mexican lightweight champion Primo Ramos for the NABF regional belt.

Randall then signed with promoter Don King and spent the next six and a half years fighting on the undercards of various championship fights promoted by King. He won all 17 of those fights, and on January 30, 1993, earned another title shot when he knocked out Rosario in the seventh round of a rematch.

Randall vs. Chávez
On January 29, 1994 Randall fought for the title against champion Julio César Chávez, in the grand opening of the MGM Grand Garden in Las Vegas. Chávez came into the fight with an 89-0-1 record and was an 18-to-1 favorite.
Randall won the early rounds, and in the middle of the fight began to build a large lead on the scorecards. Chávez then rallied, and by the 10th round, Randall held a narrow lead.  Chávez made an illegal low blow that cost Chávez a point. In the 11th round, Randall knocked Chávez down for the first time in his career. Randall was named WBC light welterweight champion on a split decision. Chavez disputed the decision and demanded a rematch. Though clearly beaten, Chávez blamed his loss on the referee who deducted two points from Chávez for low blows. This included one in the eleventh round that made the difference on judge Angel Guzman's card, making the ultimate difference on the scorecards. (Guzman scored the bout 114-113 for Randall, meaning that the fight would have ended in a draw as Chuck Giampa had Randall winning by a 116-111 margin and Abraham Chavarria scored it 114-113 for Chavez.)

Rematch against Chávez
Chávez got a rematch on May 7 of the same year and regained the title from Randall on an eight-round technical split decision. As before, a deducted point played a part in the outcome of the fight. Chavez was injured in an accidental clash of heads and unable to continue.  Randall was docked a point for the incident. Judge Dalby Shirley's scorecard read 76-75 for Chavez; with judge Ray Solis having Chavez winning by a 77-74 margin on his card and judge Tamotsu Tomihara had the fight 76-75 in Randall's favor.

On September 17, Randall was given a shot at the WBA version of the light welterweight title held by Juan Martin Coggi. He beat Coggi, defended his title twice, then lost a rematch to Coggi in January 1996 in a four-round decision in a fight ended early by a clash of heads.

Seven months later, Randall regained the WBA title, beating Coggi by unanimous decision in Buenos Aires, Argentina. He lost it in his first defense, against Khalid Rahilou on January 11, 1997.

After taking 18 months off, Randall came back in an attempt to become a four-time world champ. He won a pair of tune-up fights, then faced contender Oba Carr in February 1999 where Carr beat him on a 10-round unanimous decision.

Third fight against Chávez
On May 22, 2004,  Chávez chose Randall for his last fight before going into retirement. Randall lost a 10-round decision to Chávez in Mexico City.

PED allegations
Frankie Randall tested positive for drugs after his fight against Argentine boxer Juan Martin Coggi. The Argentine Boxing Federation claimed that Randall tested positive for multiple drugs, some of the drugs included cocaine and theophylline.

Retirement
Randall announced his retirement on January 1, 2005 after losing a fight to light-middleweight Marco Antonio Rubio. He lost a bout the following month to Mauro Lucero, and another bout later in the year. Randall's final career record is 58 wins, 18 losses and one draw, with 42 wins by way of knockout.

Death
Randall died on December 23, 2020 in his hometown of Morristown, Tennessee. The cause of death was reportedly of dementia pugilistica

Professional boxing record

References

External links

1961 births
2020 deaths
Boxers from Alabama
Sportspeople from Birmingham, Alabama
Doping cases in boxing
World Boxing Association champions
World Boxing Council champions
People from Morristown, Tennessee
American male boxers
World light-welterweight boxing champions
Light-welterweight boxers
Lightweight boxers
Welterweight boxers
Light-middleweight boxers